Respect All Lifeforms is the eighth studio album by Australian alternative rock band Custard, released on 22 May 2020 by ABC Music.

The album was preceded by the release of the single "Funky Again", which was accompanied by a video directed by longtime collaborator Andrew Lancaster.

Background 
The album's basic tracking was conducted at Poonshead Studio in Fremantle, Western Australia in one day. The studio was recommended to the band by Perth band Turnstyle, who were playing a festival with Custard on the same weekend.

Tracklist

Charts

References 

2020 albums
Custard (band) albums